Ismo may refer to:
 -ism in Spanish, Portuguese, Esperanto and Italian
 Ismo, a brand name for isosorbide mononitrate
 Ismo Leikola, Finnish comedian